Sterling Eugene Bailey (born September 13, 1992) is a former American football defensive end. He played college football at Georgia. Bailey was signed by the Indianapolis Colts as an undrafted free agent in 2016. He has also been a member of the Seattle Seahawks, Minnesota Vikings, Tampa Bay Buccaneers, Carolina Panthers, and Arizona Cardinals.

Professional career

Indianapolis Colts
After going undrafted in the 2016 NFL Draft, Bailey signed with the Indianapolis Colts on May 2, 2016. On September 3, 2016, he was waived by the Colts during final team cuts. Bailey was signed to the Colts' practice squad the following day. On September 26, 2016, he was released from the Colts' practice squad.

Seattle Seahawks
On October 4, 2016, Bailey was signed to the Seattle Seahawks' practice squad. He was released from the Seahawks' practice squad on October 18, 2016.

Minnesota Vikings
Bailey was signed to the Minnesota Vikings' practice squad on October 25, 2016. He signed a reserve/future contract with the Vikings on January 2, 2017. On May 4, 2017, he was waived by the Vikings.

Tampa Bay Buccaneers
On May 31, 2017, Bailey was signed by the Tampa Bay Buccaneers. He was waived on September 2, 2017 and was signed to the Buccaneers' practice squad the next day. He was released on September 14, 2017. He was re-signed on December 5, 2017.

Carolina Panthers
On August 7, 2018, Bailey signed with the Carolina Panthers. He was waived on August 31, 2018.

Arizona Cardinals
On July 20, 2019, Bailey was signed by the Arizona Cardinals. He was released on August 31, 2019.

References

External links
 Minnesota Vikings bio
 Indianapolis Colts bio
 Georgia Bulldogs bio

1992 births
Living people
People from Gainesville, Georgia
Sportspeople from the Atlanta metropolitan area
Players of American football from Georgia (U.S. state)
American football defensive ends
Georgia Bulldogs football players
Indianapolis Colts players
Seattle Seahawks players
Minnesota Vikings players
Tampa Bay Buccaneers players
Carolina Panthers players
Baltimore Brigade players
Arizona Cardinals players